Avlon, Avlona or Avlonas may refer to:

 Avlona, Albania, an English obsolete name of Vlorë, a seaport in Albania, still used in some other languages
 Avlona, Cyprus, a town in Cyprus
 settlements in Greece:
 Avlonas, Attica, a town in northern Attica
 Avlon, Euboea, a municipality on Euboea
 Avlona, Karpathos, a village on the island of Karpathos
 Avlonas, Messenia, a municipality in Messenia
 Avlon Industries, American hair care firm
 John Avlon (born 1973), American journalist and political commentator